State Route 40 (SR 40) is a  state highway in the northeastern part of the U.S. state of Alabama. The western terminus of the highway is at its intersection with SR 35 near Scottsboro. The eastern terminus of the highway is at its intersection with SR 117 at Hammondville, just north of the intersection of SR 117 with Interstate 59 (I-59).

Route description
SR 40 travels across the base of Lookout Mountain. The narrow, twisty roadway continues until the highway reaches Dutton in western DeKalb County. East of Dutton, the roadway has fewer curves as it continues across the county.

Major intersections

See also

References

040
Transportation in Jackson County, Alabama
Transportation in DeKalb County, Alabama